The British and Irish Meteorite Society (BIMS) is a group of 150+ Meteorite researchers and amateurs. The BIMS was formed in 2004 by the meteorite collectors Mark Ford and Dave Harris. The group provides a meteorite collecting and study focus for the UK and Ireland, and is the only meteorite group in the UK and one of only three in the entire world.  Members have made many major scientific discoveries, including the find of a rare  Pallasite meteorite, in Hambleton, Yorkshire, in 2005, and several members assisted in the search for the Winchcombe meteorite fall in 2021. Through its website the society maintains two forums, one for the general public and one for its members, additionally it has a Facebook group. The forums/groups act as a central point for the exchange of meteorite related information in the UK.

Accomplishments
In 2005 the Society donated a substantial meteorite collection to South Downs Planetarium in Chichester England, which was received by Sir Patrick Moore, and since then has donated material for study to many institutions.
Many Talks, Lectures and Exhibitions have been given by members and BIMS was a founding participant in the Brighton Science Festival event.
In 2006 a fireball response system was established, with the intention of recovering any space rock material which lands within the UK, the main aim is to ensure material is preserved for scientific study.
In October 2008 the Society attended 'Impact Day' at the Institute of Astronomy in Cambridge. This prestigious event attracted delegates from all over Europe, and included lectures by members Dr Caroline Smith (NHM), David Bryant (Spacerocks UK) and Dave Harris (BIMS)
In September 2012 the Society attended the Natural History Museum London's 'Meteorite Day'.

See also
 Glossary of meteoritics
 Meteorite
 Bolide
 Chondrite

References
Priceless Moon samples on display. BBC News – Feb 26, 2005
BIMS member discovers scientifically important meteorite in the UK
BIMS donates a large meteorite collection to Sir Patrick Moore
Member Dr Caroline Smith (curator of Meteorites at the NHM, London), on the recent acquisition of the Ivana Meteorite
Meteorite magazine, April 2004, page 4, British and Irish Meteorite Society formed.
BBC sky at night magazine, September 2007, page 70, Mark Ford of the British and Irish meteorite Society's guide to meteorite collecting.

External links
 British and Irish meteorite Society Website
 international meteorite collectors Association
 Meteoritical Society

Meteorite organizations
Scientific societies based in the United Kingdom
2004 establishments in the United Kingdom
Scientific organizations established in 2004
Astronomy in Ireland
Astronomy in the United Kingdom